Valy (until 1947 Šance) is a municipality and village in Cheb District in the Karlovy Vary Region of the Czech Republic. It has about 500 inhabitants. The rural area in the northern part of the municipality is a part of spa cultural landscape of Mariánské Lázně is protected as an urban monument reservation.

References

Villages in Cheb District